The 2015 Nottingham Open (known for sponsorship reasons as the Aegon Open Nottingham) was a combined men's and women's tennis tournament played on outdoor grass courts. It was the fifth edition of the event for the women (the first since 1974) and the 20th edition for the men (the first since 2008). It was classified as a WTA International tournament on the 2015 WTA Tour and as an ATP World Tour 250 series tournament on the 2015 ATP World Tour. The event took place at the Nottingham Tennis Centre in Nottingham, United Kingdom from 8 June through 15 June 2015 for the women, and from 21 June through 27 June 2015 for the men.

ATP singles main-draw entrants

Seeds

 1 Rankings are as of 15 June 2015.

Other entrants
The following players received wildcards into the main draw:
 Kyle Edmund
 Taylor Harry Fritz
 James Ward
 Alexander Zverev

The following players received entry from the qualifying draw:
 Ruben Bemelmans
 Dudi Sela
 Go Soeda
 Mischa Zverev

Withdrawals
Before the tournament
 Benjamin Becker →replaced by Lu Yen-hsun
 Julien Benneteau →replaced by Santiago Giraldo 
 Jérémy Chardy →replaced by Aljaž Bedene
 David Goffin →replaced by Thomaz Bellucci
 Nick Kyrgios →replaced by Alexandr Dolgopolov
 Gilles Müller →replaced by Malek Jaziri
 Jo-Wilfried Tsonga →replaced by Tim Smyczek
 Mikhail Youzhny →replaced by Denis Istomin

Retirements
 Marcos Baghdatis
 Víctor Estrella Burgos
 Vasek Pospisil

ATP doubles main-draw entrants

Seeds

1 Rankings are as of 15 June 2015.

Other entrants
The following pairs received wildcards into the doubles main draw:
  Eric Butorac /  Colin Fleming
  Ken Skupski /  Neal Skupski

The following pair received entry as alternates:
  Łukasz Kubot /  Max Mirnyi

Withdrawals
Before the tournament
  Thomaz Bellucci (back injury)

During the tournament
  Aisam-ul-Haq Qureshi (knee injury)

WTA singles main-draw entrants

Seeds

 1 Rankings are as of 25 May 2015.

Other entrants
The following players received wildcards into the main draw:
 Katy Dunne
 Johanna Konta
 Agnieszka Radwańska

The following players received entry from the qualifying draw:
 Jarmila Gajdošová
 Olga Govortsova
 Alla Kudryavtseva
 Sachia Vickery

Retirements
 Yanina Wickmayer (Gastrointestinal illness)

Withdrawals 
Before the tournament
  Mona Barthel →replaced by Yanina Wickmayer
  Alexandra Dulgheru →replaced by Stefanie Vögele
  Julia Görges →replaced by Nicole Gibbs
  Peng Shuai →replaced by Shelby Rogers
  Roberta Vinci →replaced by Wang Qiang
  Heather Watson →replaced by Magda Linette

WTA doubles main-draw entrants

Seeds

1 Rankings are as of 25 May 2015.

Other entrants
The following pair received a wildcard into the doubles main draw:
  Lucie Hradecká /  Francesca Schiavone

Champions

Men's singles

  Denis Istomin def.  Sam Querrey, 7–6(7–1), 7–6(8–6)

Women's singles

  Ana Konjuh def.  Monica Niculescu, 1–6, 6–4, 6–2

Men's doubles

  Chris Guccione /  André Sá def.  Pablo Cuevas /  David Marrero, 6–2, 7–5

Women's doubles

  Raquel Kops-Jones /  Abigail Spears def.  Jocelyn Rae /  Anna Smith, 3–6, 6–3, [11–9]

References

External links
 Website

2015 WTA Tour
2015 ATP World Tour
2015
June 2015 sports events in the United Kingdom
 in English tennis